Adonias Aguiar Filho (November 27, 1915 – August 2, 1990) was a novelist, essayist, journalist, and literary critic from Bahia, Brazil, and a member of the Academia Brasileira de Letras.

Life
Filho was born in Itajuípe, Brazil, the son of Adonias Aguiar and Rachel Bastos de Aguiar.

In 1936, 2 years after finishing high school in Salvador, he moved from the south of Bahia to Rio de Janeiro, Brazil’s capital at the time, where he continued his career in Journalism, previously started in Salvador. He worked for well known newspapers such as Correio da Manhã and Revista do Brazil. He was also a literary critic for Cadernos da "Hora Presente", from São Paulo in 1937,  A Manhã, from 1944 to 1945, along with Jornal de Letras (from 1955 to 1960) and Diário de Notícias (from 1958 to 1960). In São Paulo, he also collaborated with O Estado de S. Paulo and Folha da Manhã.

Between 1946 and 1950, he ran the book publishing company "A Noite". He was the director of the Serviço Nacional de Teatro, in 1954, and director of the Biblioteca Nacional from  1961 to 1971.

He was re-elected in 1969, 1971 and 1973. He was the president of the ABI in 1972 and president of the CFC from 1977 to 1990, when he died.

As a writer, Adonias Aguiar Filho searched for inspiration for his fiction in the "zona cacaueira" (Cocoa plantations) close to Ilhéus, back to his origins in the South of Bahia, where he was born and raised. This ambiance is well displayed in his first novel, Os servos da morte (The Servants of Death), published in 1946. In the form of the romance novel, reality served as an opportunity to recreate a world charged with symbolism, in the situations as well as in the characters, bearing witness to a tragic sense of life and worldview.

The use of original stylistic features, reflective of the internal violence of his characters gave him a fundamental place in the literary generation that created the 3rd phase of Brazilian Modernism in 1945, which was based on a return to more normal disciplines of writing.  They were concerned about writing with less formal research, while broadening their regional meanings to apply universally. Their work still has a significant influence on contemporary Brazilian literature and fiction.

He was honored with the 21st chair at the Brazilian Academy of Letters (Academia Brasileira de Letras) at the age of 53, May 23, 1969. The title was handed to him by his fellow writer from Bahia, Jorge Amado. His literary work has been translated into English, German, Spanish, French and Slovak.

He died in Ilhéus, shortly after his wife did.

Academia Brasileira de Letras

Fifth holder of the 21st Chair, originally held by Joaquim Serra; elected January 14, 1965.

Bibliography

 Renascimento do homem - essay (1937)
 Tasso da Silveira e o tema da poesia eterna - essay (1940)
 Memórias de Lázaro - novel (1952)
 Jornal de um escritor (1954)
 Modernos ficcionistas brasileiros - essay (1958)
 Cornélio Pena - critique (1960)
 Corpo vivo - novel (1962)
 História da Bahia - essay (1963)
 O bloqueio cultural - essay (1964)
 O forte - novel (1965)
 Léguas da promissão - novella (1968)
 O romance brasileiro de crítica - critique (1969)
 Luanda Beira Bahia - novel (1971)
 O romance brasileiro de 30 - critique (1973)
 Uma nota de cem – children’s literature (1973)
 As velhas - novel (1975)
 Fora da pista - children’s literature (1978)
 O Largo da Palma - novella (1981)
 Auto de Ilhéus – theater (1981)
 Noites sem madrugada - novel (1983).
 O Homem de branco - novel (1987).

Awards

Adonias Filho was awarded:
 Prêmio Paula Brito de crítica literária (Guanabara, 1968), for the book "Léguas da promissão",
 Golfinho de Ouro de Literatura (1968),
 Prêmio PEN Clube do Brasil,
 Prêmio da Fundação Educacional do Paraná (FUNDEPAR)
 Prêmio do Instituto Nacional do Livro (1968–1969)
 Prêmio Brasília de Literatura (1973), from Fundação Cultural do Distrito Federal.
 Premio Nacional de Literatura (1975), from Instituto Nacional do Livro, in the category published work (1974–1975), with the romance novel "As velhas", and
 Title of Doctor Honoris Causa by the Universidade Federal da Bahia, in 1983.

External links
Adonias na Academia Brasileira 
e-biografias 
Virtual books 
Encyclopædia Britannica 
Adonius Aguiar Filho recorded at the Library of Congress for the Hispanic Division’s audio literary archive on December 13, 1977

People from Bahia
1915 births
1990 deaths
Brazilian male dramatists and playwrights
Brazilian male novelists
Brazilian literary critics
Brazilian essayists
20th-century Brazilian novelists
20th-century Brazilian dramatists and playwrights
20th-century essayists
20th-century Brazilian male writers